Commercial Bank Group, is a financial services organization in Central Africa. The Group's headquarters are located in Douala, Cameroon, with subsidiaries in Cameroon, Chad, Central African Republic, Equatorial Guinea and São Tomé and Príncipe.

Overview
Commercial Bank Group is a large financial services conglomerate in  Central Africa, with subsidiaries in five countries. The member institutions serve both individuals and businesses, with emphasis on small-to-medium enterprises (SMEs).

Member companies
The companies that compose the Commercial Bank Group include, but are not limited to the following:

 Commercial Bank of Cameroon (CBC) -  Cameroon
 Commercial Bank Chad (CBT) -  Chad
 Commercial Bank Centrafrique (CBCA) -  Central African Republic
 Commercial Bank Equatorial Guinea (CBGE) -  Equatorial Guinea
 Commercial Bank São Tomé and Príncipe (CBSTP) -  São Tomé and Príncipe
 SFA Financial Products -  Cameroon - Commercial Bank Group has 51.4% shareholding.

Ownership
The member companies of the group are all privately owned. In 2005, Commercial Bank Group created a bank holding company, named Capital Financial Holdings S.A. (CFH), which
is the controlling entity in each of the subsidiary companies. CFH is headquartered in Luxembourg, but maintains a subsidiary in Yaoundé, Cameroon.

See also
 Commercial Bank of Cameroon
 Commercial Bank Centrafrique
 Central Bank of Central African States

External links
 Website of Commercial Bank Group 
 Website of Central Bank of Central African States

References

Banks of Cameroon
Companies based in Douala